Stephan Hocke (born 20 October 1983) is a German former ski jumper who competed from 2001 to 2012. In his debut World Cup season, he won a competition in Engelberg on 15 December 2001, which would be his only World Cup win. He also won a gold medal in the team large hill competition at the 2002 Winter Olympics in Salt Lake City.

World Cup

Standings

Wins

External links

 
 
  

1983 births
Living people
Olympic gold medalists for Germany
Olympic ski jumpers of Germany
Ski jumpers at the 2002 Winter Olympics
German male ski jumpers
People from Suhl
Olympic medalists in ski jumping
Medalists at the 2002 Winter Olympics
Sportspeople from Thuringia
21st-century German people